Randy Norton is an American college basketball coach, currently women's head coach at the University of Alabama at Birmingham.

Career
Norton played baseball and basketball at the University of Iowa.  He was on the coaching staffs at the University of Missouri and Illinois State before becoming head coach of the Blazers prior to the start of the 2013–14 season.

Head Coaching Record

References

Year of birth missing (living people)
Living people
American men's basketball players
American women's basketball coaches
Baseball players from Iowa
Basketball coaches from Iowa
Basketball players from Iowa
High school basketball coaches in the United States
Illinois State Redbirds women's basketball coaches
Iowa Hawkeyes baseball players
Iowa Hawkeyes men's basketball players
Missouri Tigers women's basketball coaches
UAB Blazers women's basketball coaches